Jarlesson Inácio Júnior (born 22 February 1990), commonly known as Juninho Potiguar, is a Brazilian footballer who plays as a forward for Brazilian club Caxias.

Career statistics

Honours
Sheriff Tiraspol	
Moldovan National Division (1): 2013–14

References

External links
 Sheriff Tiraspol profile
 
 
 

1990 births
Living people
Brazilian footballers
People from Natal, Rio Grande do Norte
Association football forwards
Sport Club do Recife players
América Futebol Clube (PE) players
Sport Club Corinthians Alagoano players
Associação Desportiva Recreativa e Cultural Icasa players
FC Sheriff Tiraspol players
Al Shabab Al Arabi Club Dubai players
Fortaleza Esporte Clube players
América Futebol Clube (RN) players
Clube de Regatas Brasil players
Boa Esporte Clube players
União Recreativa dos Trabalhadores players
Ferroviário Atlético Clube (CE) players
Sociedade Esportiva e Recreativa Caxias do Sul players
Campeonato Brasileiro Série B players
Campeonato Brasileiro Série C players
Campeonato Pernambucano players
Moldovan Super Liga players
UAE Pro League players
Brazilian expatriate footballers
Expatriate footballers in Moldova
Brazilian expatriate sportspeople in Moldova
Expatriate footballers in the United Arab Emirates
Brazilian expatriate sportspeople in the United Arab Emirates
Sportspeople from Rio Grande do Norte